Gostaresh Foolad Sahand Football Club (Previously named Gostaresh Foolad Bonab) is an Iranian football club based in Sahand, Iran. They currently compete in Iran's Azadegan League.

Season-by-Season

The table below shows the achievements of the club in various competitions.

See also
 2011–12 Hazfi Cup
 2011–12 Iran Football's 2nd Division

Football clubs in Iran
Association football clubs established in 2009
Sport in Tabriz
2009 establishments in Iran